is a railway station on the  Osaka Metro Sennichimae Line in Ikuno-ku, Osaka, Japan.

Layout
There is an island platform with two tracks on the 2nd basement.

Ikuno-ku, Osaka
Osaka Metro stations
Railway stations in Osaka
Railway stations in Japan opened in 1981